The Volleyball Thailand League is the highest level of Thailand club volleyball in the 2015–16 season and the 11th edition.

Team
 Nakhon Ratchasima
 Chonburi E-Tech Air Force
 Wing 46 Phitsanulok
 Kasetsart
 Sisaket-Krungkao
 Cosmo Chiang Rai
 Ratchaburi
 Rajamangala Thanyaburi

Ranking 

|}

Round 1

Round 2 

|}

Final standing

Awards

See also 
 2015–16 Women's Volleyball Thailand League

External links
 Official Website
 Official Facebook

Volleyball,Men's Thailand League
Volleyball,Men's Thailand League
2015